Triage may refer to:

Methodologies 
 Triage, a process of prioritizing patients based on the severity of their condition so as to treat as many as possible when resources are insufficient for all to be treated immediately
 Field triage, decision-making early in the medical prioritization process
 Business triage - commercial evaluation
 Bug triage in software engineering
 Ecological triage - used in evaluating potential environment interventions
 Requirements triage, the process of prioritizing requirements in software development

Cultural manifestations 
 Triage (novel), a 1998 novel
 Triage (film), a 2009 film adaptation of the novel
 Triage, a 1992 album by David Baerwald
 Triage, a 2019 album by Methyl Ethel
 Triage (X-Men), a character from the X-Men comics franchise